Practical Photography was a UK monthly photography magazine published by the Bauer Media Group since it was acquired from EMAP in 2008. Established in 1959, It ceased publishing on 2 June 2020 following Bauer Publishing's decision to stop printing many of its magazines due to the economic impact of the COVID-19 pandemic.
The magazine included subject guides, camera and editing tutorials, interviews, Q&As and product reviews, as well as how-to videos. It also featured Camera School, an annual camera skills course for beginners. When it ceased publication, the group editor was Ben Hawkins.

Alongside a monthly magazine, Practical Photography could also be found on social media, including the popular Practical Photography Talk Facebook group and its YouTube channel Practical Photography Magazine.

Staff
Staff members for the magazine (as of last publication):
 Group Editor, Ben Hawkins 
 Deputy Editor, Chris Parker
 Features Editor, Adam Atkins
 Gear and Technique Editor, Kirk Schwarz
 Senior Art Editor, Chris Robinson
 Videographer, Jake Kindred
 Production Editor, Marie Marsh
 Editorial Assistant, Beth Mackman

References

External links

1959 establishments in the United Kingdom
Bauer Group (UK)
Visual arts magazines published in the United Kingdom
Monthly magazines published in the United Kingdom
Magazines established in 1959
Photography magazines
Photography in the United Kingdom
2020 disestablishments in the United Kingdom
Defunct magazines published in the United Kingdom
Magazines disestablished in 2020